Sangan-e Kuknak (also Romanized as Sangān-e Kūknāk; also known as Sangān-e Kūgnāk) is a village in Taftan-e Jonubi Rural District, Nukabad District, Khash County, Sistan and Baluchestan Province, Iran. At the 2006 census, its population was 206, in 48 families.

References 

Populated places in Khash County